This article lists records and statistics associated with West Ham United.

Team records

Scoring records
 Biggest victory: 10–0 v Bury, Football League Cup (25 October 1983)
 Biggest league win: 8–0 v Rotherham United (8 March 1958), and v Sunderland (19 October 1968)
 Biggest defeat: 0–7 v  Barnsley (1 September 1919), v Everton (22 October 1927), and v Sheffield Wednesday (28 November 1959)

League sequences
 Wins: 9 (19 October to 4 December 1985)
 Draws: 5 (7 September to 5 October 1968, and 15 October to 1 November 2003)
 Defeats: 9 (28 March to 29 August 1932)

(source:)

Goalscorers

Leading first class goalscorers
 As of 22 January 2020
 Current players in bold.

Other top goalscorers

Top goalscorers by season
For a list of top scorers by season see List of West Ham United F.C. seasons.

References

Statistics
West Ham